Andrea Pisani (born 15 March 1987) is an Italian professional footballer.

Career

Early career
Pisani began his youth career with Juventus FC in the late 1990s, and was promoted to the Primavera youth set-up in 2005. The young defender was part of a very elite youth set-up alongside the likes of Domenico Criscito, Paolo De Ceglie, Davide Lanzafame, Claudio Marchisio, Michele Paolucci, Sebastian Giovinco, and Dario Venitucci, all of which have represented Italy at various stages of international football. After graduating the Juventus youth system, Pisani was called up to the first team squad in 2006, and was part of the team that led Juventus back to Serie A in 2007.
During the season, Pisani managed his senior debut and three other appearances with Juventus during the Serie B campaign, but after graduating the youth team, he was loaned out to fourth division club, Juve Stabia, joining Juventus teammate, Stefano Di Cuonzo. After an impressive loan spell that included 26 appearances and 5 goals, he moved to the Italian third division with Pro Patria, where he went on make 25 appearances, and added 3 more goals to his tally.

Serie B
On 30 June 2009 Pisani returned to Juventus; in July a deal to move on loan again to Lega Pro Prima Divisione side A.C. Arezzo was finalized but was immediately cancelled. Only a few weeks later, the defender was sent on loan by Juventus, to Serie B side A.S. Cittadella, where he has managed a single goal in 21 appearances for the Serie B club, helping them avoid relegation. On 1 July 2010 he again returned to Juventus, but did not train with the club's first team, and was not called up to the UEFA Europa League squad by then coach, Luigi Delneri. Pisani was then loaned out to Serie B newcomers, Calcio Portogruaro Summaga, alongside Salvatore D'Elia. In what had hoped to be a successful season for the 22-year-old, the 2010-11 Serie B season proved to be far less successful than his previous loan stints, as the player made just 8 league appearances after suffering from major injury woes. Portogruaro suffered from relegation, finishing 22nd in the league.

S.S. Barletta
On 30 June 2011 Pisani again returned to Juventus, but was soon sent on loan once more. Following a poor campaign for club and player, Pisani was sold in a co-ownership deal to third-tier side, S.S. Barletta Calcio ahead of the 2011-12 Lega Pro Prima Divisione season.

Serie D
In December 2019, Pisani joined Serie D club APC Chions.

References

External links
 
 Andrea Pisani at TuttoCampo

1987 births
People from Castelfranco Veneto
Living people
Italian footballers
Juventus F.C. players
U.S. Pistoiese 1921 players
Aurora Pro Patria 1919 players
A.S. Cittadella players
A.S.D. Portogruaro players
A.S.D. Barletta 1922 players
A.S.D. Sorrento players
S.S. Arezzo players
S.S. Akragas Città dei Templi players
A.S.D. Cjarlins Muzane players
Serie B players
Serie C players
Serie D players
Eccellenza players
Association football defenders
Sportspeople from the Province of Treviso
Footballers from Veneto